Pierre Vignal (1855-1925) was a French painter. He became a Knight of the Legion of Honour in 1912.

References

1855 births
1925 deaths
19th-century French painters
Chevaliers of the Légion d'honneur
20th-century French painters